Just Dance is a 2009 music rhythm game developed by Ubisoft Milan and Ubisoft Paris and published by Ubisoft as the first main installment of the Just Dance series. The game was released exclusively for the Wii on November 17, 2009, in North America, November 26, 2009, in Australia, and November 27, 2009, in Europe.

Expanding upon a concept introduced in a minigame for Rayman Raving Rabbids: TV Party, players mimic the motions of an on-screen dancer's choreography for a selected song, using the Wii Remote to judge the player's motions and accuracy (eschewing accessories such as physical dance pads).

Just Dance was released to mixed-to-negative reviews. It was criticized for its simplistic gameplay, poor motion detection, and a lack of progression or additional content beyond what was included on-disc. At the same time, the simplistic gameplay of Just Dance was praised for being accessible to a casual audience, its "fun" soundtrack and dance routines, and for becoming more enjoyable as a multiplayer party game. Just Dance was a major commercial success, selling over 4.3 million copies worldwide and establishing a franchise that, as of October 2013, had collectively sold over 40 million units, making it Ubisoft's second-largest franchise.

Gameplay

After selecting a song and either a short or full version of it, players are presented with an on-screen dancer, as well as an occasional display of scrolling pictograms/silhouettes representing specific poses. While holding a Wii Remote in their right hand, players follow the moves of the on-screen dancer and their choreographed routine. Players are judged by their animated score icons on a ranking scale for the accuracy of each of their moves in comparison to that of the on-screen dancer, and receive points. There are three judgements, "X", "OK" and "Great". The "X" means that the player didn't get the move, "OK" means that the player tried, but isn't quite there, or the player is almost there, and "Great" means the player did an awesome job on the move. Some moves are shake moves, where the shake meter appears in front of their animated score icons, giving the players a chance to shake their Wii Remotes as fast as they can to earn bonus points.

Along with standard play, three other modes are included; the "Warm Up" mode serves as a practice mode. In "Strike a Pose" mode, players are instructed at random to freeze (similar to Red light green light). In "Last One Standing" mode, players are given seven lives; players lose lives on mistakes, and gain them back after hitting five correct moves in a row; a player is eliminated if they lose all of their lives.

Development 

The concept of Just Dance originated from a minigame developed for inclusion in the Rayman Raving Rabbids series. Ubisoft France's managing director Xavier Poix and his team felt the Wii Remote and Nunchuk would work well for music games; Rayman Raving Rabbids 2 featured a music minigame that IGN compared to Guitar Hero—where players shook the Wii Remote or Nunchuk when prompted to play an instrument. For Rayman Raving Rabbids: TV Party, the concept was iterated into a pose-based dance game. Proving popular in demonstrations, the concept was refined and re-developed into a stand-alone game.

Just Dance was developed by a small team of around 20 at Ubisoft Paris and Ubisoft Milan, and was only officially pitched six months prior to its eventual release. Poix explained that unlike the Raving Rabbids games, which he described as being a "gamer's game", Just Dance was designed to contrast skill-based rhythm games with a concept and control scheme that would be accessible to a mainstream audience, encouraging them to "[get] off the couch and [have] fun together". Ubisoft producer Florian Granger noted that Just Dance was designed to help players overcome their inhibitions and anxiety towards dance, helping them build a "vocabulary" of moves they can practice in a "safe context", and with the game itself being the focal point of attention rather than themselves. He reminisced that "everyone remembers going to a nightclub or school disco where it takes a couple of hours before anyone has the bottle to get up and dance. Most guys do the fix-placed-beer-bottle dance or neck-shake to the beat."

Creative director Gregoire Spillmann argued that existing dance games at the time merely instructed players to press buttons with their feet, rather than actually dance. Acknowledging Dance Dance Revolution players who use its gameplay as a base for their own dance routines, Spiller likened Just Dance to be a reversal of the concept, in which the dance moves themselves were "fit" into the gameplay, and could be applied outside the game as well. The team deliberately focused on building the mechanics of Just Dance solely around the Wii Remote, eschewing dedicated accessories such as dance pads, arm or leg bands, as well as the Nunchuk attachment. Spillmann explained that such accessories were "distractions" that restricted the motion of players; for instance, the team felt that the Nunchuk's short cord limited how it could be used in routines, and that removing it helped the game focus less on precision and more on letting players feel like they are dancing.  The lack of dedicated peripheral also contrasted with other music games that utilized increasingly intricate and expensive controllers.

While Poix felt that his team had developed a game that could potentially become successful, his colleagues at Ubisoft Paris doubted Just Dance. Poix explained that "people thought it would never work, because people don't dance, or that it wasn't precise enough for people to actually learn to dance." Granger felt that the development team would be "cynical" of Just Dance due to the oversaturated market of casual games on the Wii, but noted that there was a "sense of excitement" among them, as it would be based upon a proven codebase, and used "respected" games such as Dance Dance Revolution as an example to build upon.

Soundtrack
Just Dance features a soundtrack consisting of 33 songs.

Reception

Reviews 

Just Dance received generally negative reviews from critics; Metacritic lists the game with an aggregate score of 49 out of 100 based on 21 critic reviews, indicating a "generally unfavorable" reception.

GameSpot was relatively positive, praising Just Dance for having simplistic gameplay, and remarking that its dance routines were "both fun and at times downright hilarious". However, the game's motion detection was considered "frustrating and unrewarding", and the game was also panned for its graphical quality, and its lack of career modes or downloadable content. In conclusion, giving the game a 5.5 out of 10, GameSpot felt that Just Dance would appeal best as a multiplayer party game, where players "[can] attempt the silly dances, laugh at each other's mistakes, and sing along to the cheesy pop tunes", but was "water-thin" as a single-player game.

Nintendo World Report felt that the game's soundtrack was "fun" but "cheesy" at times. The game's user interface was described as being "colorful" but minimalistic, while the appearance of the on-screen dancers were compared to iPod commercials. It was also noted that the pictograms additionally used to represent moves sometimes contradicted with the instructions implied to the player via the on-screen dancer, "making it look like timing relies on the pose you make rather than the movements you do", but that "once you 'get it', Just Dance becomes very enjoyable, very enduring, and extremely silly and fun." In conclusion, it was felt that Just Dance was "very rough but shows promise, especially when played with friends."

IGN.com felt that Just Dance was "an experience so devoid of depth or even basic game concepts that it would be considered a rip-off even if it was one of those Chinese knock-off systems masquerading as an existing console", further criticizing the game for its basic gameplay mechanics, "sloppy" motion detection, lack of variation or unlockable content, and excluding the Lady Gaga song of the same name. IGN concluded by urging readers not to buy, rent, or even think about Just Dance, "lest someone at Ubisoft find out and they prep a Just Dance 2. Such would be the end of all things, mark my words."

Sales 
In contrast to its critical reception, Just Dance was a major commercial success for Ubisoft; for a period, it was the top-selling video game in the United Kingdom, and in March 2010, Ubisoft announced that Just Dance had sold 2 million copies worldwide. In October 2010, the company announced that over 4.3 million copies of the game had been sold worldwide.

Legacy 
The success of Just Dance led to the development of a sequel, Just Dance 2, which focused on adding new features and refinements to the game—such as improvements to its motion tracking system, new game modes, and support for downloadable content. Sales of Just Dance 2 surpassed that of the original; with over 5 million copies as of January 2011, it was the best-selling third-party title for the Wii. Laurent Detoc, CEO of Ubisoft's North American operations, stated that this achievement "[solidified] the Just Dance brand as a pop culture phenomenon."  Poix felt that "there's a pressure within Ubisoft to keep Just Dance enormous, and we think we can make it enormous. But it wasn't like that initially, because at the end of the first one, people—even us—had our doubts that it would last. After the first one we thought maybe there would be a second one, and then it would be over."

The release of motion control accessories for the Wii's competitors in the seventh generation of video game consoles—PlayStation Move for PlayStation 3, and Kinect for Xbox 360, spawned competing motion-controlled dance games such as Dance Central, Dance Masters, Dance Paradise, and SingStar Dance. The 2010 Wii release of Dance Dance Revolution also added a mode combining its traditional dance pad gameplay with choreography gestures performed using the Wii Remote and Nunchuk; in its review, IGN declared that the dance pad had become "antiquated" by motion-controlled dance games.

Just Dance 3 would introduce versions of the game for PS3 and Xbox 360, as well as Wii, and was ultimately the second best-selling video game of 2011 overall, finishing only behind Call of Duty: Modern Warfare 3.  Tony Key, Ubisoft's senior vice president of sales and marketing, complimented the success of Dance Central for proving the viability of dance games for Kinect, but iterated that as a brand, Just Dance had become "a juggernaut way beyond anything that any dance franchise has ever done." As of October 2013, the overall Just Dance franchise had collectively sold over 40 million units, making it Ubisoft's second-largest franchise behind Assassin's Creed.

Just Dance 2020 was released on the Wii and Nintendo Switch, but not the Wii U.

References

2009 video games
Dance video games
Fitness games
Music video games
Just Dance (video game series)
Ubisoft games
Wii games
Wii-only games
Video games developed in France
Video games developed in Italy
Multiplayer and single-player video games